The Zimbabwe national cricket team toured South Africa for a two-match ODI series from 8 to 10 November 2009.

Squads

ODI series

1st ODI

2nd ODI

2009–10 South African cricket season
2009-10
International cricket competitions in 2009–10
South Africa